Li Jiaqi (born 27 July 1995 or 1996) is a Chinese professional racing cyclist, who most recently rode for UCI Women's Continental Team . She is from Heilongjiang.

See also
 List of 2015 UCI Women's Teams and riders

References

External links

1990s births
Living people
Chinese female cyclists
Cyclists from Heilongjiang
Year of birth missing (living people)
21st-century Chinese women